The Gold Line is an automated people mover line, part of Bangkok's rapid transit system. It primarily serves as a feeder line between the BTS Silom line and Iconsiam shopping center. The line will be extended  along Somdet Chao Phraya road to connect with the future MRT Purple Line southern extension.

The Gold Line is operated by Bangkok Mass Transit System Public Company Limited (BTSC) under a 30 year contract. The BTSC also operates the BTS Skytrain. A flat fare of 15 baht is charged.

History 
The line was not part of the current M-Map Master Plan as the line was proposed by the owners of Iconsiam mall in July 2015 to provide a feeder service to Iconsiam. The project was approved by the Thai Cabinet in September 2016 with an initial planned opening of late 2018. Preliminary works began in June 2018 with major construction commencing in September 2018.

Design and development of the line was the responsibility of Krungthep Thanakom PCL, an enterprise of the Bangkok Metropolitan Administration. The project budget of 3.8 billion Thai baht was fully funded by the proponent of the project, shopping mall company Siam Piwat who has responsibility for all construction costs. All advertising revenue and operating profits will be collected by Siam Piwat Company during the 30 year concession period.

At the end of August 2020, overall work for the Gold Line was 95% complete. The line was due to open on 1 October 2020 and initial test runs began on 11 September. However, further test runs revealed that additional tests would be required of the signaling and operational systems before full operations could start. The President of the BTSC stated that a further two months of tests were required and that the line would not open until December 2020. In early December, an opening date of 16 December 2020 was announced. Upon opening, a one month free travel period was in effect until 15 January 2021.

Route 

The Gold Line starts adjacent to Krung Thon Buri BTS station running 500m east to Charoen Nakhon road, where it then runs north for  past Iconsiam. It will initially terminate at Klong San station near Lat Ya road intersection and provide an interchange with the future SRT Dark Red Line southern extension.

Future 1 km extension
The  extension was originally planned to open in 2023, but will now open in later years.

Services 
Gold Line trains operate from 06:00 to 00:00 with a frequency range of six to twelve-minute intervals. During the free fare period for the first month of operations in January 2021, the line was averaging between 5000 to 6000 daily passengers with 3000 using Iconsiam station.

Rolling stock 
The Gold Line uses Bombardier Innovia APM 300 automated people movers with rubber tyres manufactured by CRRC Puzhen Bombardier Transportation Systems (joint venture of Bombardier Transportation and CRRC Nanjing Puzhen) in Wuhu, Anhui, China. Innovia APMs are commonly used at airports to transport passengers between terminals. The first set was due to be delivered in April 2020, but was delayed due to a COVID-19 related lockdown in Anhui province.

The first set later arrived in Thailand on 18 June 2020, the remaining 2 sets were delivered in August 2020.

Stations

Line map

Network map

See also 

 Mass Rapid Transit Master Plan in Bangkok Metropolitan Region
 MRT (Bangkok)
 MRT Blue Line
 MRT Brown Line
 MRT Grey Line
 MRT Light Blue Line
 MRT Orange Line
 MRT Purple Line
 MRT Yellow Line
 BTS Skytrain
 Sukhumvit Line
 Silom Line
 Airport Rail Link (Bangkok)
 SRT Dark Red Line
 SRT Light Red Line
 Bangkok BRT
 BMA Bang Na-Airport Line

References

External links 
 Airport Rail Link, BTS, MRT & BRT network map
 MRTA

2020 establishments in Thailand
Rapid transit in Bangkok
Railway lines opened in 2020